Late to the Party may refer to:

 "Late to the Party", song by Kacey Musgraves from Pageant Material
 "Late to the Party", song by Joyner_Lucas and Ty Dolla Sign
 "Late to the Party", episode of The L Word: Generation Q
 "Late to da Party", song by Lil Nas X and YoungBoy Never Broke Again